Samir Adnan El-Jisr (born 10 June 1944) is a renowned lawyer, legislator and previous Lebanese politician from the Future Movement. He was elected to represent Tripoli in the Parliament of Lebanon for consecutive terms since 2005 to 2022. 

Samir Adnan El-Jisr was previously elected as head of the Bar Association of Tripoli, and served as minister of Justice (2000-2003), and minister of education (2003-2004) in the governments of Rafic Al Hariri.

See also 

 List of members of the 2018–2022 Lebanese Parliament

References 

Living people
1944 births
21st-century Lebanese politicians
Future Movement politicians
Members of the Parliament of Lebanon
Lebanese Sunni Muslims
Lebanese Sunni politicians
Education ministers of Lebanon
Justice ministers of Lebanon
People from Tripoli, Lebanon